LaVerne Harrison "Kip" Taylor (November 25, 1907 – July 17, 2002) was an American football player and coach. He served as the head coach at Oregon State College, now Oregon State University, from 1949 to 1954, compiling a record of 20–36. He played college football as an end as the University of Michigan from 1927 to 1930.

Playing career
Taylor earned all-state honors in football and basketball at Pioneer High School. He attended the University of Michigan, graduating with an education degree in 1931. There he played right end for the Wolverines. Taylor scored the first touchdown at Michigan Stadium in 1927.

Coaching career
Taylor began his coaching career at the high school level. He was the head football coach at George Rogers Clark High School in Whiting, Indiana before returning to his alma mater, Pioneer High School, as head football coach in 1940. In six seasons at Pioneer, he led his teams to a record of 37–5 with undefeated seasons in 1940, 1941, and 1943. In January 1946, he was hired as an assistant coach at Syracuse University to serve under head football coach Biggie Munn.

At Oregon State, Taylor's teams had a 20–36 record in his six seasons guiding the Beavers, but that included a 5–1 record against Oregon. In his first season, he led the 1949 Oregon State Beavers football team to an upset of eighth-ranked Michigan State, 25–20, when they were three-touchdown underdogs.

Later life and death
Taylor managed the Columbia Edgewater Country Club in Portland, Oregon, and the University of Michigan Golf Course before retiring in 1972. Taylor died of natural causes on July 17, 2002, in Ann Arbor, Michigan.

Head coaching record

College

References

1907 births
2002 deaths
American football ends
Michigan Wolverines football players
Michigan State Spartans football coaches
Oregon State Beavers football coaches
Syracuse Orange football coaches
High school football coaches in Indiana
High school football coaches in Michigan
Players of American football from Ann Arbor, Michigan
Coaches of American football from Michigan